Leonidas Donskis  (13 August 1962 – 21 September 2016) was a Lithuanian-Jewish philosopher, political theorist, historian of ideas, social analyst, and political commentator, professor of politics and head of "VDU Academia Cum Laude" at Vytautas Magnus University, Honorary Consul of Finland in Kaunas and deputy chairman of the Lithuanian Jewish Community. He was also the member of the European Parliament (MEP) from 2009 to 2014.

As a public figure in Lithuania, he acted as a defender of human rights and civil liberties. In 2004, Donskis has been awarded by the European Commission  the title of the Ambassador for Tolerance and Diversity in Lithuania. A center-right politician, he has always been opposed to all extreme or exclusionary attitudes and forms of violent politics, and, instead, has been leaning to liberalism with its advocacy of individual reason and conscience, ability to coexist with democratic programs of other non-exclusive ideologies, and moderation.

He died on 21 September 2016, in Vilnius Airport of an apparent heart attack.

Early life
Leonidas Donskis was born in Klaipėda in Lithuanian Jewish family. He graduated from Lithuanian State Conservatoire (now Lithuanian Academy of Music and Theater), majoring in philology and theater, and then pursued his graduate studies in philosophy at the University of Vilnius, Lithuania. Having received his first doctorate in philosophy from the University of Vilnius, he later earned his second doctorate in social and moral philosophy from the University of Helsinki, Finland.

His main scholarly interests lie in philosophy of history, philosophy of culture, philosophy of literature, philosophy of the social sciences, civilization theory, political theory, history of ideas, and studies in Central and East European thought.

Credentials
Doctorate (1999) in Social and Moral Philosophy (D.Soc.Sc.), University of Helsinki, Finland. The dissertation title: The End of Ideology and Utopia? Moral Imagination and Cultural Criticism in the Twentieth Century.
Doctorate (1990) in Humanities/L.H.D. (Philosophy), Vilnius University, Lithuania. The dissertation title: Culture in Crisis and the Philosophy of Culture: Oswald Spengler, Arnold J. Toynbee, Lewis Mumford.
M.A. (1987) in Philosophy, Vilnius University, Lithuania (a certificate of graduate studies in philosophy, which was an equivalent of M.A.).
B.A. (1985) (Diploma in Philology and Theater), Lithuanian State Conservatoire (now Lithuanian Academy of Music and Theater).

Professional experience
A wandering scholar, he has researched and lectured in the United States, Great Britain, and Europe. He has been involved in various public philosophical and political debates at the Institute of Art and Ideas. Donskis has been an IREX-International Research and Exchanges Board Fellow, a Fulbright Scholar, and a visiting professor of philosophy at Dickinson College in Pennsylvania, US; a Swedish Institute Guest Researcher at the University of Gothenburg and a guest professor of East European studies at the University of Uppsala, Sweden; a Leverhulme Trust Visiting Research Fellow at the University of Bradford, Great Britain; Paschal P. Vacca Chair (distinguished visiting professor) of Liberal Arts at the University of Montevallo in Alabama, US; and a fellow at the Collegium Budapest/Institute for Advanced Study, Hungary.

Until 7 June 2009, Leonidas Donskis acted as professor of political science at Vytautas Magnus University in Kaunas, Lithuania. From 2005 to 2009, he served as professor and dean of the Faculty of Political Science and Diplomacy at Vytautas Magnus University. In addition, he acted as docent of social and moral philosophy at the University of Helsinki, and as extraordinary visiting professor of cultural theory at Tallinn University, Estonia. From September 2014 Leonidas Donskis acted as vice-president for research at ISM University of Management and Economics. He was also a member of the editorial board of the magazine New Eastern Europe.

Political activity
Leonidas Donskis was invited to campaign for the European Parliament by the Lithuanian Liberal Movement Party in 2009.  He was the number one candidate on the list of the Party.

At the European Parliament (term 2009–2014) Leonidas Donskis worked as a part of  the Alliance of Liberals and Democrats for Europe group (ALDE), which is the third largest political group in the Parliament. He was a member of the Development Committee and member of the Subcommittee on Human Rights and also a substitute member at the committee of Civil Liberties, Justice and Home Affairs.

Leonidas Donskis was the full member of the EU and Armenia, Azerbaijan, and Georgia Parliamentary Cooperation Committee delegation, as well as, the delegation of the Parliamentary Assembly of the EURONEST. He was also a substitute member of the EU relations with Israel, Moldova and the Euro-Mediterranean Parliamentary Assembly delegations.

Bibliography
Donskis has been published widely in international refereed journals, and is the author or editor of more than fifty books, some of them in English, including:

Liquid Evil (Cambridge: Polity Press, 2016) (with Zygmunt Bauman),
Moral Blindness: the Loss of Sensitivity in Liquid Modernity (Cambridge: Polity Press, 2013) (with Zygmunt Bauman),
Modernity in Crisis: A Dialogue on the Culture of Belonging (New York: Palgrave Macmillan, 2011),
Troubled Identity and the Modern World (New York: Palgrave Macmillan, 2009),
Power and Imagination: Studies in Politics and Literature (New York: Peter Lang, 2008),
Loyalty, Dissent, and Betrayal: Modern Lithuania and East-Central European Moral Imagination (Amsterdam & New York: Rodopi, 2005),
Forms of Hatred: The Troubled Imagination in Modern Philosophy and Literature (Amsterdam & New York: Rodopi, 2003; VIBS-Value Inquiry Book Series Nomination for the 2003 Best Book in Social Philosophy in North America; VIBS 2003 Best Book Award),
Identity and Freedom: Mapping Nationalism and Social Criticism in Twentieth-Century Lithuania (London & New York: Routledge, 2002),
The End of Ideology and Utopia? Moral Imagination and Cultural Criticism in the Twentieth Century (New York: Peter Lang, 2000).

Donskis’s works originally written in Lithuanian and English have been translated into Danish, Estonian, Finnish, German, Hungarian, Italian, Korean, Polish, Portuguese, Romanian, Russian, Spanish, Swedish, Turkish, and Ukrainian. He edited book series for Editions Rodopi, B. V. (Amsterdam and New York), one in Baltic studies (On the Boundary of Two Worlds: Identity, Freedom, and Moral Imagination in the Baltics), and another – VIBS-Value Inquiry Book Series. From 2005 to 2009, he served as a Member of the Standing Committee for the Humanities (SCH) in the European Science Foundation (ESF).

References

External links
An official Leonidas Donskis website
About L. Donskis in the European Parliament
Complete bibliography of L. Donskis
Articles by L. Donskis in DefendingHistory.com

1962 births
2016 deaths
20th-century Lithuanian philosophers
21st-century philosophers
Liberal Movement (Lithuania) MEPs
Lithuanian Academy of Music and Theatre alumni
Lithuanian people of Jewish descent
MEPs for Lithuania 2009–2014
People from Klaipėda
Social philosophers
Vilnius University alumni
Academic staff of Vytautas Magnus University
Honorary consuls to Lithuania
21st-century diplomats
Finnish diplomats